Ornithinicoccus hortensis is a Gram-positive bacterium species from the genus Ornithinicoccus which has been isolated from garden soil from Gießen in Germany.

References 

Intrasporangiaceae
Bacteria described in 1999